Alexander Satariano (born 25 October 2001) is a Maltese footballer who plays as a forward for Balzan on loan from the Italian  club Frosinone, and the Malta national football team.

Club career
On 3 July 2021, he signed a three-year contract with Italian Serie B club Frosinone. On 31 January 2022, he was loaned to Pergolettese. On 31 August 2022, Satariano was loaned by the Maltese club Balzan.

International career
Satariano made his international debut for Malta on 11 November 2020 in a friendly match against Liechtenstein. He scored his first goal with the senior national team during a 2-2 World Cup Qualifying draw vs Slovakia.

Career statistics

International

International goals

References

External links
 Alexander Satariano league statistics
 
 

2001 births
Living people
Maltese footballers
Malta youth international footballers
Malta under-21 international footballers
Malta international footballers
Association football forwards
St. Andrews F.C. players
Sliema Wanderers F.C. players
Frosinone Calcio players
U.S. Pergolettese 1932 players
Balzan F.C. players
Maltese Premier League players
Serie B players
Serie C players
Maltese expatriate footballers
Expatriate footballers in Italy
Maltese expatriate sportspeople in Italy